The 1997–98 Canada men's national ice hockey team represented Canada at the 1998 Winter Olympics held in Nagano, Japan.

Canada's team, coached by Marc Crawford, placed fourth in the Olympic tournament.

History
1998 was the first year that the modern NHL took a break to allow its players to participate in the Olympics, allowing the top countries to field teams with professionals of top calibre. Team Canada's Olympic roster was selected by Bobby Clarke, who was then general manager of the Philadelphia Flyers. Eric Lindros was named captain over longtime leaders such as Wayne Gretzky, Steve Yzerman, and Ray Bourque. Rob Zamuner was a surprise pick, while Mark Messier and Scott Niedermayer were omitted.

The Canadian team, despite a strong start in the round robin, failed to win a medal, losing 3 - 2 to Finland in the bronze medal game.

1998 Winter Olympics roster
Head coach: Marc Crawford
Rob Blake - Los Angeles Kings
Raymond Bourque - Boston Bruins
Rod Brind'Amour - Philadelphia Flyers
Martin Brodeur - New Jersey Devils
Shayne Corson - Montreal Canadiens
Éric Desjardins - Philadelphia Flyers
Theoren Fleury - Calgary Flames
Adam Foote - Colorado Avalanche
Wayne Gretzky (A) - New York Rangers
Curtis Joseph - Edmonton Oilers
Trevor Linden - New York Islanders
Eric Lindros (C) - Philadelphia Flyers
Al MacInnis - St. Louis Blues
Joe Nieuwendyk - Dallas Stars
Keith Primeau - Carolina Hurricanes
Chris Pronger - St. Louis Blues
Mark Recchi - Montreal Canadiens
Patrick Roy - Colorado Avalanche
Joe Sakic - Colorado Avalanche
Brendan Shanahan - Detroit Red Wings
Scott Stevens (A) - New Jersey Devils
Steve Yzerman (A) - Detroit Red Wings
Rob Zamuner- Tampa Bay Lightning

See also
 Canada men's national ice hockey team
 Ice hockey at the 1998 Winter Olympics
 Ice hockey at the Olympic Games
 List of Canadian national ice hockey team rosters

References

 
Canada men's national ice hockey team seasons